Dürmentingen is a town in the district of Biberach in Baden-Württemberg in Germany.

References

External links
Official Website
Music Orchestra of Dürmentingen

Biberach (district)
Württemberg